David or Dave Hall may refer to:

Sports
David Hall (athlete) (1875–1972), American middle-distance runner
David Hall (footballer) (born 1950s), English professional footballer active in the 1970s
David Hall (horse trainer) (born 1963), Australian horse trainer
Dave Hall (rugby league), rugby league footballer of the 1980s for Great Britain, and Hull Kingston Rovers
David Hall (rugby league) (born 1968), Australian rugby league footballer of the 1980s and 1990s
David Hall (rugby union) (born 1980), New Zealand
David Hall (Australian tennis) (born 1970), Australian wheelchair tennis player
David Hall (American tennis), American tennis player
David Hall (baseball coach), Rice Owls baseball head coach, 1981–1991

Politicians
David Hall (Australian politician) (1874–1945), Australian politician
David Hall (Canadian politician), first leader of the Prince Edward Island New Democratic Party in Canada
David Hall (Delaware governor) (1752–1817), American lawyer and governor of Delaware
David Hall (Irish politician), Irish Labour party politician, represented Meath in the 1920s
David Hall (Oklahoma governor) (1930–2016), U.S. Democratic Party politician
David Hall (Swedish politician), served as Minister of Finance of Sweden, 1949
Dave Hall (Dayton mayor) (died 1977), American politician of the Ohio Republican party
Dave Hall (Ohio state representative) (born 1960), Republican member of the Ohio House of Representatives
David McKee Hall (1918–1960), Representative from North Carolina

Arts
David Hall (sound archivist) (1916–2012), American sound archivist and writer
David Hall (video artist) (1937–2014), British video artist
Dave Hall (record producer), American record producer
David S. Hall (art director) (1905–1964), British art director
Dave U. Hall, American musician

Others
David D. Hall, American historian
David J. Hall (photographer) (born 1943), underwater wildlife photographer
David M. Hall, writer and corporate trainer
David S. Hall (RFC officer) (1892–1917), World War I flying ace
David Hall (campaigner), Irish businessman and campaigner 
David Hall (chemist) (1928–2016), New Zealand chemist
David Hall (printer) (1714–1772), American printer and business partner with Benjamin Franklin
David Locke Hall (born 1955), former Assistant United States Attorney, Naval Intelligence officer, and author
David Hall (paediatrician) (born 1945), British paediatrician
Davey Hall (born 1951), British trade unionist
David Hall, American inventor and businessman, founder of Velodyne, Velodyne Lidar and Velodyne Marine

See also
David Halls, one of the chefs in Hudson and Halls